Strood Academy is a coeducational secondary school and sixth form with academy status, located in Strood in the English county of Kent.

History

Strood Academy was formed in September 2009 following the closure of Chapter School and Temple School, and today the school is located on the former site of Chapter School. The school moved into new buildings on the site in September 2012, which were designed in partnership with Nicholas Hare Architects and built by BAM as the main contractor at a cost of £27 million.
The academy moved into the Leigh Academies Trust in 2017.

Dijana Piralic became Principal, replacing Kim Gunn, in March 2020.

Governance
Strood Academy is part of the Leigh Academies Trust, a multi-academy trust, formed of 25 schools based in the Kent, Medway and South East London areas.  Its Head Office is on the same site as Strood Academy; it houses its Executive Team and the other central teams including Finance, Business, Marketing, HR, Engagement and IT.

Strood Academy was sponsored by the University for the Creative Arts in 2013.

Academics

Key Stage 3
Strood Academy is a candidate school for the IB Middle Years Programme. In addition to following the UK National curriculum, this "a commitment to improve the teaching and learning of a diverse and inclusive community of students by delivering challenging, high quality programmes of international education that share a powerful vision."

Key Stage 4
The school offers GCSEs and BTECs as programmes of study for its pupils; while students in the sixth form have the option to study from a range of A Levels and BTEC Level 3s.
In 2018, 5% of year 11s had entries in all EBACC subjects.

Sports
When the school was designed in 2011, sports facilities were included that could be let out of hours. A spin off company now does this too. There are multi-use sports spaces, a dance studio, tennis/netball courts and all-weather pitches.

References

External links
 

Secondary schools in Medway
Academies in Medway
University for the Creative Arts
Educational institutions established in 2009
2009 establishments in England